J-League Jikkyō Winning Eleven 2001 (known as World Soccer Winning Eleven 4)  is a sports video game developed by Konami for the PlayStation exclusively in Japan in June 2001. It is an addition to the Winning Eleven J-League series, and the successor to J-League Winning Eleven 2000. The game only features club teams (no national teams) and teams from both tiers of the J. League totalling 28 teams. The game also features seven unlockable European teams (Real Madrid, Barcelona, Manchester United, Arsenal, Juventus, Roma, and Milan). The game uses the Winning Eleven 2000 engine.

2001 video games
Japan-exclusive video games
J.League licensed video games
Pro Evolution Soccer
PlayStation (console) games
PlayStation (console)-only games
Video games developed in Japan